Come Drive In is a South Korean television program that airs on MBN, and aired every Monday at 23:00 (KST).

It was originally aired on Sundays at 21:20 (KST) for its first two episodes.

Overview
Lee Soo-geun and Boom, together with one special host, are put in charge of a special drive-through karaoke. From singing to talks, everything is done within the vehicle.

Rules
Episode 1-7
 Contestants can be of any background, regardless whether he/she is able to drive a vehicle or not. Solo contestants or contestants coming in groups are welcome, and any type of vehicle is allowed.
 Before entering, he/she would choose one song to sing. After that, he/she will drive in to the booth, where the hosts are situated, and then sing the song.
 After singing, if all the hosts have passed the contestant, he/she can get a cash prize by randomly choosing only one car key out of five, and unlock the car's boot to confirm the amount of the cash prize. The amounts are ₩100,000, ₩200,000, ₩300,000, ₩500,000 and ₩1,000,000.
 If he/she have failed to get all the three passes, they can choose a host for the token of appreciation. Each of the hosts represents one of the three types of tokens of appreciation decided at the start of the episode.

Episode 8-10
 There is a different set of rules compared to the first seven episodes, whereby instead of every contestant getting the chance of winning the cash prize, in each episode, contestants will compete against one another to win only one cash prize.
 After singing, if all the hosts have passed the contestant, not only he/she will instantly get ₩100,000, he/she will temporarily take the first place spot.
 The hosts will also decide whether another contestant performs better than the contestant currently in the first place spot. The former will take over the first place spot from the latter, if the hosts decided to open the car's boot with the "Change of Come Drive King". If the hosts opened the car's boot with the ₩100,000 cash prize, the contestant will drive away with it, and not replace as the new Come Drive King.
 The final contestant in the first place spot for the episode will be crowned the Come Drive King (드루왕) and wins the cash prize of ₩3,000,000.

Host
 Lee Soo-geun
 Boom

Episodes

Notes

References

South Korean reality television series
2020 South Korean television series debuts
2020 South Korean television series endings
Korean-language television shows